Emil Yanchev may refer to:
 Emil Yanchev (footballer, born 1974)
 Emil Yanchev (footballer, born 1999)